San Cristóbal, Spanish for Saint Christopher, may refer to:

Places

Argentina 
 San Cristóbal, Santa Fe
 San Cristóbal, Buenos Aires, a neighborhood (barrio)

Bolivia 
 San Cristóbal mine (Bolivia), a silver, zinc and lead mine

Chile 
 San Cristóbal Hill, a hill and public park in Santiago
 San Cristóbal de La Paz, a former fortress

Colombia 
 San Cristóbal, Bogotá
 San Cristóbal, Bolívar

Cuba 
San Cristóbal, Cuba, in the province of Artemisa
Havana, founded as Villa de San Cristóbal de la Habana

Dominican Republic 
San Cristóbal Province
San Cristóbal, Dominican Republic

Ecuador 
San Cristóbal Island, an island in the Galápagos

El Salvador
San Cristóbal, Cuscatlán

Guatemala 
Ciudad San Cristóbal, a neighbourhood in the city of Mixco
San Cristóbal Acasaguastlán
San Cristóbal Cucho
San Cristóbal Totonicapán
San Cristóbal Verapaz

Mexico 
San Cristóbal de las Casas, a city in Chiapas
San Cristóbal Amatlán
San Cristóbal Amoltepec
San Cristóbal Ecatepec
San Cristóbal (Mexibús, Line 2), a BRT station in Ecatepec de Morelos, Mexico
San Cristóbal (Mexibús, Line 4), a BRT station in Ecatepec de Morelos, Mexico
San Cristóbal, Guanajuato, the location of the Vicente Fox Center of Studies, Library and Museum
San Cristóbal Lachirioag
San Cristóbal Suchixtlahuaca

Nicaragua 
San Cristóbal Volcano

Panama 

Cristóbal Island, Bocas del Torro Province
Estadio San Cristóbal, a stadium in Chiriquí Province

Paraguay 
 San Cristóbal (Asunción)
 San Cristóbal District, Paraguay

Peru 
 San Cristóbal District, Luya, a district in the Amazonas Region

Philippines 
Mount San Cristobal 
San Cristobal River

Puerto Rico 
 San Cristóbal (Puerto Rico), a sector in San Juan

Solomon Islands 
 San Cristóbal or Makira, an island

Spain 

 San Cristóbal (Madrid), a neighbourhood
 San Cristóbal (Madrid Metro), a metro station
 San Cristóbal, Cantabria, a town
 San Cristóbal (Oscos), a parish in Villanueva de Oscos, Asturias
 San Cristóbal de La Laguna, a suburban area of Santa Cruz de Tenerife (province)
 Fort San Cristóbal (Spain), a fort in Navarre
 San Cristóbal Lighthouse, a lighthouse on La Gomera, Canary Islands

United States 
 San Cristobal, New Mexico, a census-designated place in Taos County

Venezuela 
 San Cristóbal, Táchira

Other uses 
 San Cristóbal (volleyball club), Dominican Republic
 San Cristobal de la Habana (cigar), a brand of Cuban cigars
 Cristóbal Carbine, an automatic rifle

See also
 Cristóbal (disambiguation)
 Castillo San Cristóbal (disambiguation)